Palace of Culture and Sports is an indoor complex for culture and sport located in Varna, Bulgaria. The complex has three sports halls - "Kongresna Hall", "Mladost Hall" and "Hall 20". The Palace of Culture and Sports was completed in 1968.

A complete copy of the "Palace of Culture and Sports" exists in Africa - this is the "National Arts Theatre", Iganmu, in Lagos, Nigeria. The building was designed by the same architect - Stefan Kolchev.

Kongresna Hall
Kongresna Hall is currently home of the Bulgaria national volleyball team and basketball team Cherno More Port. The arena holds 6,000 people. The venue was completely renovated in 2015.

Sport events
 1984: Weightlifting at the Friendship Games
 1987: XIII World Rhythmic Gymnastics Championships
 2008: WAKO European Championships
 2012: SUPERKOMBAT World Grand Prix III
 2018: FIVB Volleyball World Championship
 2021: 2021 Rhythmic Gymnastics European Championships

See also
 List of indoor arenas in Bulgaria

References

External links

  

Indoor arenas in Bulgaria
Buildings and structures in Varna, Bulgaria
Event venues established in 1968
Sports venues completed in 1968
1968 establishments in Bulgaria
Sports venues in Varna, Bulgaria
Music venues in Bulgaria
Basketball venues in Bulgaria
Convention centres in Bulgaria
Culture in Varna, Bulgaria
Weightlifting venues
Venues of the Friendship Games